Fernando Miquel Gil Eisner (8 May 1953 – 17 January 2020) was a Uruguayan Roman Catholic bishop.

Gil Eisner was born in Uruguay and was ordained to the priesthood in 1983. He served as bishop of the Roman Catholic Diocese of Salto, Uruguay, from 2018 until his death in 2020.

Notess

1953 births
2020 deaths
Bishops appointed by Pope Francis
Uruguayan Roman Catholic bishops
Roman Catholic bishops of Salto